Serpianosaurus is an extinct genus of pachypleurosaurs known from the Middle Triassic (late Anisian and early Ladinian stages) deposits of Switzerland and Germany.

Fossils of the type species, S. mirigolensis, have been found from the middle Grenzbitumenzone, the oldest strata of Monte San Giorgio, Switzerland, an area well known for its abundant pachypleurosaur remains. The locality dates back to sometime around the Anisian/Ladinian boundary of the Middle Triassic, around 242 Ma, with Serpianosaurus most likely occurring strictly during the latest Anisian. This makes it the one of the oldest sauropterygians from Monte San Giorgio, with only the rare pachypleurosaur Odoiporosaurus being older. Certain aspects of its morphology also suggest it is one of the most basal forms.

Cajus G. Diedrich in 2013 described and named a second species, S. germanicus, based on a postcranial skeleton and various additional isolated remains from the Karlstadt Formation of Germany. This species represents the oldest well known record of this genus, as it comes from the upper Pelsonian, dating to the late Anisian stage of the Middle Triassic.

The genus can be distinguished from other closely related pachypleurosaurs on the basis of its proportionally large skull and straight jaw. Like many other pachypleurosaurs, sexual dimorphism can be seen in Serpianosaurus. Males and females are thought to differ in humeral size and shape. Any pachyostosis of the ribs is absent in Serpianosaurus specimens. It is closely related to the genus Neusticosaurus.

References 

Pachypleurosaurs
Anisian life
Triassic sauropterygians
Middle Triassic reptiles of Europe
Triassic Germany
Triassic Switzerland
Fossils of Germany
Fossils of Switzerland
Fossil taxa described in 1989
Fossil taxa described in 2013
Sauropterygian genera